Giovanni Battista de Aquena (1576–1615) was a Roman Catholic prelate who served as Bishop of Bosa (1613–1615).

Biography
Giovanni Battista de Aquena was born in Sassari, Italy in 1576.
On 18 March 1613, he was appointed during the papacy of Pope Paul V as Bishop of Bosa.
On 14 April 1613, he was consecrated bishop by Giovanni Garzia Mellini, Cardinal-Priest of Santi Quattro Coronati with Marco Cornaro, Bishop of Padua, and Alessandro Guidiccioni (iuniore), Bishop of Lucca, serving as co-consecrators. 
He served as Bishop of Bosa until his death in 1615.

References 

17th-century Roman Catholic bishops in Spain
Bishops appointed by Pope Paul V
1576 births
1615 deaths